Stuart Hall may refer to:

People
 Stuart Hall (presenter) (born 1929), British television and radio presenter
 Stuart Hall (cultural theorist) (1932–2014), Jamaican cultural theorist in Britain and first editor of the New Left Review
 Stuart Hall (boxer) (born 1980), British bantamweight champion in 2010
 Stuart Hall (racing driver) (born 1984), British racing driver
 , British patristics scholar

Other uses
 Stuart Hall Building, Kansas City, Missouri
 Stuart Hall High School, boys' school in San Francisco, California
 Stuart Hall School, private girls' boarding/co-ed day student school in Staunton, Virginia
 Stuart Hall, County Tyrone, a townland in County Tyrone, Northern Ireland

See also
Stewart Hall (disambiguation)

Architectural disambiguation pages
Hall, Stuart